Quincy Wilson (born August 16, 1996) is an American football cornerback who is a free agent. He played college football at Florida.

Early years
Wilson attended the University School of Nova Southeastern University in Fort Lauderdale, Florida. During his high school football career, he had 77 tackles and six interceptions. He committed to the University of Florida to play college football.

College career
As a freshman at Florida in 2014, Wilson played in all 12 games and made two starts. He recorded 22 tackles and an interception. As a sophomore in 2015, he played in all 14 games with nine starts and recorded 26 tackles and two interceptions. He returned as a starter his junior year in 2016. As a junior in 2016, Wilson played 13 games with 33 tackles, a sack, three interceptions, and six passes defended. Wilson had one of the quickest rises of any draft prospect in 2016. Prior to 2016, Wilson played a reserve role behind Vernon Hargreaves III, Brian Poole, and Teez Tabor. After the departure of Hargreaves, Wilson displayed great coverage skills and athleticism. In a single season, Wilson went from a largely unknown prospect to a possible first round pick. After the season, Wilson decided to forgo his senior year and enter the 2017 NFL Draft.

Professional career
Wilson was one of 60 collegiate defensive backs to attend the NFL Scouting Combine in Indianapolis, Indiana. He completed all the combine drills and finished first among all defensive backs in the short shuttle and 14th in the three-cone drill. On March 28, 2017, Wilson attended Florida's pro day, but opted to stand on his combine numbers and only run coverage and receiving drills as scouts and team representatives from 28 NFL teams attended, including New England Patriots' head coach Bill Belichick. Wilson attended private workouts and visits with multiple teams, including the Dallas Cowboys, Philadelphia Eagles, and Cleveland Browns. At the conclusion of the pre-draft process, Wilson was projected to be a second round pick by NFL draft experts and scouts. He was ranked the second best cornerback prospect in the draft by Sports Illustrated, was ranked the sixth best cornerback by ESPN, was ranked the eighth best cornerback by NFLDraftScout.com,
and was ranked the ninth best cornerback prospect in the draft by NFL analyst Mike Mayock.

Indianapolis Colts
The Indianapolis Colts selected Wilson in the second round (46th overall) of the 2017 NFL Draft. He was the eighth cornerback selected and was the first of two cornerbacks the Indianapolis Colts drafted in 2017, ahead of fifth round pick Nate Hairston.

On May 11, 2017, the Indianapolis Colts signed Wilson to a four-year, $5.76 million contract that includes $3.06 million guaranteed and a signing bonus of $2.33 million.

Throughout training camp, Wilson competed against veteran journeyman Rashaan Melvin for the job as the No. 2 starting cornerback after it was left vacant by the departure of Patrick Robinson in free agency. Head coach Chuck Pagano named Wilson the third cornerback on the depth chart behind Vontae Davis and Rashaan Melvin.

He made his professional regular season debut in the Indianapolis Colts' season-opener at the Los Angeles Rams and recorded one tackle in their 46–9 loss. The following week, he earned his first career start in place of Vontae Davis, who missed the first three games due to a groin injury. Wilson collected two combined tackles and two pass break ups during a 16–13 loss to the Arizona Cardinals. Wilson aggravated a knee injury he suffered during the preseason before the Colts' Week 3 victory over the Cleveland Browns. He missed the following ten games (Weeks 3-12). Wilson recovered from his knee injury prior to Week 6, but remained inactive. Head coach Chuck Pagano stated Wilson was a healthy scratch due to his inability to play special teams, but it was speculated this was a minor contributing factor to his absence and when Wilson was asked why he was inactive he stated, "I don't know." Wilson remained a healthy scratch after the Colts released starting cornerback Vontae Davis after Week 9 and finally returned in Week 13 after injuries to Rashaan Melvin and Pierre Desir depleted their options at cornerback. He was named the starting cornerback along with rookie Nate Hairston after Melvin and Desir missed the remaining four games of the regular season. On December 14, 2017, Wilson recorded a season-high eight combined tackles during a 25–13 loss to the Denver Broncos. In Week 17, he started his fourth consecutive game and recorded two solo tackles, a pass deflection, and made his first career interception on quarterback T. J. Yates in the Colts' 22–13 victory against the Houston Texans. The Indianapolis Colts finished third in the AFC South with a 4-12 record and head coach Chuck Pagano was fired after the season.

New York Jets
On April 25, 2020, Wilson was traded to the New York Jets in exchange for the 211th pick in the 2020 NFL Draft. He played in three games before getting waived on November 6, 2020.

New York Giants
On November 17, 2020, Wilson was signed to the New York Giants' practice squad. He was elevated to the active roster on December 19 for the team's week 15 game against the Cleveland Browns, and reverted to the practice squad after the game. He signed a reserve/future contract on January 4, 2021. He was placed on injured reserve on August 24, 2021. He was released on December 17.

Miami Dolphins
On January 20, 2022, Wilson signed a reserve/future contract with the Miami Dolphins. He was released on August 29, 2022.

Pittsburgh Steelers
On September 21, 2022, Wilson was signed to the Pittsburgh Steelers practice squad. He was released on November 22.

NFL career statistics

References

External links

Florida Gators bio

1996 births
Living people
Players of American football from Fort Lauderdale, Florida
American football cornerbacks
Florida Gators football players
Indianapolis Colts players
New York Jets players
New York Giants players
NSU University School alumni
Miami Dolphins players
Pittsburgh Steelers players